Joseph Pedlosky (born April 7, 1938) is an American physical oceanographer. He is a scientist emeritus at the Woods Hole Oceanographic Institution. Pedlosky was elected to the United States National Academy of Sciences in 1985. He is the author of the textbooks Geophysical Fluid Dynamics, Ocean Circulation Theory, and Waves in the Ocean and Atmosphere: Introduction to Wave Dynamics.

Biography

Pedlosky grew up in Paterson, New Jersey. He completed his Ph.D. in 1963 under the supervision of Jule Charney at MIT.

In 1966, as a young assistant professor at MIT, he refused to sign the Massachusetts Teachers' Oath ultimately bringing the case to the state supreme court. The Massachusetts Supreme Judicial Court invalidated the legislation in 1967 in its ruling Pedlosky v. Massachusetts Institute of Technology.

Research

Pedlosky has made fundamental contributions in the study of baroclinic instability and the thermal structure of the ocean, particularly the oceanic thermocline.

Awards and honors
1970: Clarence Leroy Meisinger Award, American Meteorological Society
1981: Fellow of the American Meteorological Society
1985: Elected to the United States National Academy of Sciences
1986: Fellow of the American Geophysical Union
1996 Elected to American Academy of Arts and Sciences
1997: Fellow of the American Association for Advancement of Science
2005: Sverdrup Gold Medal, American Meteorological Society 
2009: Bernard Haurwitz Award, American Meteorological Society
2011: Maurice Ewing Medal, American Geophysical Union

References

Works

External links
 Joseph Pedlosky's homepage at the Woods Hole Oceanographic Institute

Physical oceanographers
American oceanographers
Living people
Fluid dynamicists
Members of the United States National Academy of Sciences
1938 births
Fellows of the American Geophysical Union
Massachusetts Institute of Technology alumni
Woods Hole Oceanographic Institution
Sverdrup Gold Medal Award Recipients
Fellows of the American Meteorological Society